Gunnel Maria Ahlin (née Hellman, Orsa församling, Dalarna, 1 June 1918 – Stockholm, 7 January  2007) was a  Swedish writer and teacher.

Her parents were the rector Johannes Hellman and his wife Aina Albihn. She married Lars Ahlin in 1946, and they had a son, the astronomer Per Ahlin. Gunnel Ahlin debuted in 1960 with the novel Voices one summer and made his breakthrough in 1974 with the historical novel Hannibal Son.

Works 
Röster en sommar, 1960
Här dansar, 1962
Puls, 1964
Refuge, 1967
Hannibal sonen, 1974
Hannibal segraren, 1982
Lars Ahlin växer upp, 2001
Nu ska vi ta pulsen på världen, 2005

Awards
1982– Kellgrenpriset
1983 – Aniarapriset
2001 – De Nios Vinterpris
2002 – Birger Schöldströms pris

Further reading

External links and references

 

1918 births
2007 deaths
Swedish writers